Gymnocarena lichtensteinii is a species of tephritid or fruit flies in the genus Gymnocarena of the family Tephritidae.

Distribution
Mexico.

References

Tephritinae
Insects described in 1830
Diptera of North America